Hugh Cameron  was a Scottish footballer who played league football for Rochdale and non league football for various other clubs.

References

Rochdale A.F.C. players
Burnley F.C. players
King's Park F.C. players
Scottish footballers
Association football forwards